Links is the second album by folk band Kerfuffle.

Track listing

(All tracks arranged by Kerfuffle)

Personnel
Sam Sweeney (fiddle, djembe)
Hannah James (Accordion, piano, vocals)
Chris Thornton-Smith (Guitar, bouzouki)
Tom Sweeney (Bass guitar)

2004 albums
Kerfuffle albums